Anthony James Pawson  (18 October 1952 – 7 August 2013) was a British-born Canadian scientist whose research revolutionised the understanding of signal transduction, the molecular mechanisms by which cells respond to external cues, and how they communicate with each other. He identified the phosphotyrosine-binding Src homology 2 (SH2 domain) as the prototypic non-catalytic interaction module. SH2 domains serve as a model for a large family of protein modules that act together to control many aspects of cellular signalling. Since the discovery of SH2 domains, hundreds of different modules have been identified in many proteins.

Biography
Born in Maidstone, England, the son of the sportsman and writer Tony Pawson, and botanist and high-school teacher Hilarie, he was the eldest of three children. He was educated at Winchester College and Clare College, Cambridge, where he received an MA in biochemistry followed by a PhD from King's College London in 1976. From 1976 to 1980 he pursued postdoctoral work at the University of California, Berkeley. From 1981 to 1985, he was Assistant Professor in microbiology at the University of British Columbia.

Pawson was a Distinguished Investigator and former Director of Research at the Samuel Lunenfeld Research Institute of Mount Sinai Hospital and Professor in the Department of Molecular Genetics at the University of Toronto both of which he joined in 1985.

Pawson died on 7 August 2013 of unspecified causes at the age of 60.

Honours and awards
 1994 Gairdner Foundation International Award
 1994 Fellow of the Royal Society of London and the Royal Society of Canada
 1995 Robert L. Noble Prize from the National Cancer Institute of Canada
 1998 Pezcoller-AACR International Award for Cancer Research
 1998 Heineken Prize for Biochemistry and Biophysics, Royal Netherlands Academy of Arts and Sciences
 1998 The Royal Society of Canada Flavelle Medal for meritorious achievement in biological science
 2000	J. Allyn Taylor International Prize in Medicine
 2004 Louisa Gross Horwitz Prize from Columbia University
 2004 Poulsson Medal, the Norwegian Society of Pharmacology and Toxicology
 2004 Associate of the National Academy of Sciences (US)
 2004 Member of the American Academy of Arts and Sciences
 2005 Wolf Prize in Medicine "for his discovery of protein domains essential for mediating protein-protein interactions in cellular signaling pathways, and the insights this research has provided into cancer"
 2005 The Royal Medal (The Queen's Medal) from The Royal Society of London
 2006 Companion of Honour
 2007 Premiers Summit Award
 2007 Howard Taylor Ricketts Award from University of Chicago
 2008 Kyoto Prize  – "Japan's Nobel" for "Proposing and Proving the Concept of Adapter Molecules in the Signal Transduction"
 2012 Thomson Reuters Citation Laureates, candidate for Nobel Prize in Medicine "for identification of the phosphotyrosine binding SH2 domain and demonstrating its function in protein-protein interactions"
 2013 Annual award of the Canadian National Proteomics Network, thereafter named the CNPN-Tony Pawson Proteomics Award.

References

External links
 
  
 
 Anthony Pawson official website at the Samuel Lunenfeld Research Institute
 The Official Site of Louisa Gross Horwitz Prize
  Online Publications (University of Toronto)

1952 births
2013 deaths
People educated at Winchester College
Alumni of Clare College, Cambridge
Alumni of King's College London
English biochemists
English emigrants to Canada
Canadian biochemists
Canadian molecular biologists
Fellows of the Royal Society of Canada
Fellows of the Royal Society
Foreign associates of the National Academy of Sciences
Kyoto laureates in Basic Sciences
Members of the Order of Ontario
Members of the Order of the Companions of Honour
Winners of the Heineken Prize
Officers of the Order of Canada
Academic staff of the University of British Columbia
Academic staff of the University of Toronto
Wolf Prize in Medicine laureates
Royal Medal winners
English molecular biologists
People from Maidstone
Canadian Fellows of the Royal Society